HM Prison Beechworth, now known as Beechworth Gaol, was a medium security Australian prison located in Beechworth, Victoria, Australia.

Construction of the current structure was begun in 1859 and completed in 1864 at a cost of £47,000. The prison closed in 2004 and the site has been purchased by private developers. A replacement facility, the Beechworth Correctional Centre, was opened in January 2005.

History
HM Prison Beechworth was built on the site of Beechworth's first stockade between 1859 and 1864 at a cost of £47,000. The old Beechworth Prison was designed and constructed by Victoria's Public Works Department between 1857 and 1864.

The prison was built in stages between 1858 and 1864 using honey-coloured granite quarried on site. The Beechworth Gaol is one of nine Victorian prisons designed on the radiating 'panopticon' principle which had proved an efficient, cost-effective design for easy surveillance of prisoners by allowing guards to watch over a large area from a central observation point.

When opened in 1860, Beechworth provided single cells for 36 prisoners. The accommodation was doubled on the building's completion in 1864. The prison initially housed male and female prisoners, who were kept occupied with work of practical benefit to the town. Between 1918 and 1925 the prison closed from lack of numbers, then operated as a reformatory for habitual male offenders between 1925 and 1951. It became a training prison for straight-sentence prisoners after 1951 until its closure in 2004.

Despite numerous minor alterations since 1864 the largely intact features include the cell blocks, observation hall, turnkey's quarters, gaoler's quarters, kitchen wing exterior, warder's quarters, watchtowers, perimeter and division walls, the iron entrance gates, entrance court, and yards with the exception of the 1861 female yards which were built over in 1925. Original stairs, balustrades, architraves, skirtings, doors and windows also survive. Slate roofing has been replaced with corrugated iron and louvred ventilators have been removed from cell block roofs. The quarry is a significant feature in the grounds.

The prison is historically significant for its associations with the early development of Beechworth as the government administrative centre of north-eastern Victoria. It is part of a major precinct of public buildings, and has links to numerous other buildings in Beechworth which used granite quarried and broken at the prison by male inmates. It is also significant for its associations with the bushranger Ned Kelly and the Kelly story. Kelly served six months in the prison in 1870-71 for assault and was held there during his committal trial for murder in 1880. It was also in Beechworth Prison that Kelly's mother, Ellen and two associates of the Kelly family served sentences in the late 1870s for the attempted murder of Constable Alexander Fitzpatrick. It was this incident and the resulting convictions which are credited as being the catalyst for the so-called Kelly Outbreak.

Beechworth Gaol is further associated with Kelly as the place where twenty suspected Kelly sympathisers were held in 1879 in an attempt to limit support to the Kelly gang. The iron gates were installed at this time as it was feared that there might be an attempt to break the sympathisers out of the prison. The bushranger Harry Power was also imprisoned here. It was with Power that Kelly became involved in bushranging as a teenager. It was information supplied to the police by Jack Lloyd, not Ned Kelly as is sometimes thought, that eventuated in Power's arrest.

Beechworth Prison is architecturally significant as an outstanding example of a panopticon prison, of which nine erected in Victoria, and as one of only two which continue to operate as prisons. Its architecture epitomises the severely simple Classical style of nineteenth-century prisons commissioned by the Public Works Department.

Notable prisoners
Joe Byrne
Steve Hart
Ned Kelly
Aaron Sherritt
Carl Williams

Executions

References

1864 establishments in Australia
2004 disestablishments in Australia
Beechworth
Beechworth
Museums in Victoria (Australia)
Prison museums in Australia